Kuek may refer to:
 Kuek, Iran, a village
 Kuek, a subgroup of the Atuot people of South Sudan

People with the surname Kuek include:
Desmond Kuek (born 1967), Singaporean business executive and former general
Ani Lorak (born Karolina Kuek, 1978), Ukrainian entertainer